Birge Malcolm Clark (April 16, 1893 – April 30, 1989) was an American architect, called “Palo Alto's best-loved architect” by the Palo Alto Weekly; he worked largely in the Spanish Colonial Revival style.

Biography

Early life
Clark was born April 16, 1893, in the Women’s and Children’s Hospital in San Francisco, California, though his birth certificate was destroyed in the San Francisco earthquake. He was the son of Hanna Grace Birge and Arthur Bridgman Clark, a professor of art and architecture at Stanford and the first mayor of Mayfield, California, later part of Palo Alto. He graduated from Palo Alto High School in 1910. He received an A.B. degree in Graphic Design from Stanford University in 1914, and received a Bachelors degree in Architecture from Columbia University in 1917. He served in the United States Army, as an observation balloon pilot in World War I; he was shot down by a German pilot and won the Silver Star for gallantry.

Career
His principal architectural works at Stanford University are the Lou Henry Hoover House (assisting his father and now the residence of the university President), the three John Stauffer laboratories (1960’s), and the Seeley G. Mudd Chemistry Building (1977). 

His principal works in Palo Alto include the old Police Station and Fire station (now the senior citizen’s center), the Lucie Stern Community Center, the President Hotel, the Palo Alto Post Office (1932), the Palo Alto Medical Clinic, and much of the 500 block of Ramona Street in downtown Palo Alto. Some of the notable and historic homes Clark built in Palo Alto include the Norris House at 1247 Cowper Street, the Dunker House at 420 Maple Street and Lucie Stern’s house at 1990 Cowper Street.

Personal life
He was married to the former Lucile Townley, daughter of Stanford mathematician and astronomer Sidney Dean Townley for sixty-three years, until her death in 1986. They had four sons: Richard Townley Clark, Dean Townley Clark, Birge Gaylord Clark, and Malcolm Mallory Clark, along with 18 grandchildren.

Notable buildings by Birge Clark

Publications

See also 

 National Register of Historic Places listings in Santa Clara County, California

References

External links 

 
 Sound recording of Birge Clark (May 1984), from the Stanford University audio collection
 Birge Clark Oral History (October 1985), from Palo Alto Historical Association Moving Image and Audio Collection

Research resources
Birge Malcolm Clark Papers, 1914-1985 (5 linear ft.) are housed in the Department of Special Collections and University Archives at Stanford University Libraries
 XML catalog of correspondence with Herbert Hoover.
Guide to the Birge Malcolm Clark, Lou Henry Hoover House Papers, 1921- 1949, from the Online Archive of California

1893 births
1989 deaths
20th-century American architects
Palo Alto, California
Recipients of the Silver Star
People from Palo Alto, California
Palo Alto High School alumni
Stanford University alumni